This is a list of notable Indian comedians, sorted by country or area of notability.

India 

 2 Foreigners In Bollywood
 Ahsaan Qureshi
 Ajey Nagar (CarryMinati)
 Akaash Singh
 Ali
 Allu Ramalingaiah
 Amit Bhadana
 Anubhav Singh Bassi
 Anup Kumar
 Appurv Gupta
 Atul Khatri
 Bharti Singh
 Bhuvan Bam
 Binnu Dhillon
 Biswa Kalyan Rath
 Brahmanandam (Kanneganti Brahmanandam)
 Charle
 Chinmoy Roy
 Goundamani
 Gurpreet Ghuggi   
 Gursimran Khamba
 Harisree Ashokan
 Harsha Chemudu
 Jagathy Sreekumar
 Janagaraj
 Jaswinder Bhalla
 Jaya Prakash Reddy
 Johny Lever Janumala
 Kader Khan
 Kanan Gill
 Kaneez Surka
 Kapil Sharma
 Karthik Kumar
 Kenny Sebastian
 Keshto Mukherjee
 Kishore Kumar
 Kunal Kamra
 Mallika Dua
 Mehmood
 Mubeen Saudagar
 Munawar Faruqui
 Mir
 M. S. Narayana
 Santhanam
 Santhanam
 Nishant Tanwar
 Prudhvi Raj
 Padmanabham
 Papa CJ
 Rabi Ghosh
 Raghu Babu
 Raja Babu
 Rajendra Nath
 Rajpal Yadav 
 Rao Gopal Rao
 Rehman Khan
 Rohan Joshi
 Rudranil Ghosh
 Samay Raina
 Sanjay Rajoura
 Santosh Dutta
 Sapan Verma
 Saswata Chatterjee
 Satish Kaushik
 Saanand Verma
 Senthil
 Shyam Rangeela
 Sivakarthikeyan
 Sorabh Pant
 Sumona Chakravarti
 Sumukhi Suresh
 Sunil
 Sunil Grover
 Sunil Pal
 Tanmay Bhat
 Tulsi Chakraborty
 Upasana Singh
 Utpal Dutta
 V.I.P. 
 Vadivelu
 Varun Grover (writer)
 Vasu Primlani
 Vennela Kishore
 Venu Madhav
 Vir Das
 Vivek
 Zakir Khan (comedian)

Bollywood (Hindi cinema)

 Ahsaan Qureshi
 Akshay Kumar
 Ali Asgar
 Anupam Kher
 Ashok Saraf
 Asit Sen
 Asrani
 Bhagwan Dada
 Bharti Singh
 Bharti Singh
 Bomman Irani
 Dada Kondke
 Deven Verma
 Govinda
 I. S. Johar
 Jagdeep
 Jaspal Bhatti
 Johnny Lever
 Johnny Walker
 Kader Khan
 Kapil Sharma
 Keshto Mukherjee
 Kiku Sharda
 Kishore Kumar
 Krishna Abhishek
 Laxmikant Berde
 Manorama
 Mehmood
 Mukri
 Navin Prabhakar
 Om Prakash
 Paintal
 Paresh Rawal
 Preeti Ganguly
 Rajendra Nath
 Rajpal Yadav
 Raju Srivastav
 Rakesh Bedi
 Satish Kaushik
 Satish Shah
 Shakti Kapoor
 Sudesh Lehri
 Sumeet Raghavan
 Sunil Grover
 Sunil Grover
 Sunil Pal
 Tiku Talsania
 Tun Tun
 Vir Das

Tollywood (Telugu cinema)

 Brahmanandam (Kanneganti Brahmanandam)
 Kota Srinivasa Rao
 Sunil (Indukuri Sunil Varma)
 Tanikella Bharani
 Rajendra Prasad (Gadde Rajendra Prasad)
 Rao Gopal Rao
 Jaya Prakash Reddy
 Mallikarjuna Rao
 AVS (Amanchi Venkata Subrahmanyam)
 L.B. Sriram (Lanka Bhadradri Sri Ram)
 Ali (Basha Ali)
 M.S. Narayana (Mailavarapu Surya Narayana)
 Naresh
 Allari Naresh (Edara Naresh)
 Venu Madhav
 Babu Mohan
 Krishna Bhagavan
 Dharmavarapu Subrahmanyam
 Sudhakar (Betha Sudhakar)
 Saptagiri
 Bithiri Sathi
 Hyper Aadi
 Vennela Kishore
 Rahul Ramakrishna
 Dhanraj
 Priyadarshi Pulikonda
 Kovai Sarala
 Dharmavarapu Subramanyam
 Sudigali Sudheer
 Raghu Babu (Yerra Raghu Babu)
 Rajababu (Punyamurthula Appalaraju)
 Giri Babu (Yerra Seshagiri Rao)
 Chandramohan
 Kallu Chidambaram
 Girija
 Khayyum (Khayyum Ali; brother of Ali)
 Krishnudu (Alluri Krishnam Raju)
 Sri Lakshmi
 Allu Rama Lingaiah
 Nagesh (Ceiyur Krishna Gundu Rao)
 Padmanabham
 Rama Prabha
 Nutan Prasad (Tadinada Varaprasad)
 Chitti Babu Punyamurthula
 Thagubothu Ramesh
 Gundu Hanumantha Rao
 Kondavalasa Lakshmana Rao
 Relangi (Relangi Venkata Ramayya)
 Suthi Veerabhadra Rao
 Ramana Reddy (Thikkavarapu Venkata Ramana Reddy)
 Srinivasa Reddy
 Ironleg Sastri (Gunupudi Viswanath Shastri)
 Srihari (Raghumudri Srihari)
 Suryakantham
 Suthivelu (Kurumaddali Lakshmi Narasimha Rao)
 Viva Harsha
 Venu Thottempudi
 Telangana Sakuntala
 Srinivas Avasarala
 Uttej
 Fish Venkat
 Chitram Seenu
 Chalam

Kollywood (Tamil cinema)

 Vadivelu
 Chitti Babu
 Cho Ramaswamy
 Crazy Mohan
 Ennatha Kannaiya
 Ganja Karuppu
 Goundamani
 Idichapuli Selvaraj
 Imman Annachi
 J.P. Chandrababu
 Janakaraj
 Jangiri Madhumitha
 K.A. Thangavelu
 Kaali Venkat
 Kalabhavan Mani
 Kalaivanar NS Krishnan
 Kali N. Rathnam
 Karunakaran
 Karunas
 Kovai Sarala
 Loose Mohan
 M. Saroja
 M.S. Baskar
 Madhan Bob
 Manivannan
 Manorama
 Mayilsamy
 Santhanam
 Nagesh (Ceiyur Krishna Gundu Rao)
 Omakuchi Narasimhan
 Rajendran
 RJ Balaji
 Chachu
 Sathish
 Sathyan
 Senthil
 Sivakarthikeyan
 Soori
 Suruli Rajan
 Thengai Srinivasan
 Vadivel Balaji
 Chinni Jayanth
 Vaiyapuri
 Vennira Aadai Moorthy
 Vidyullekha Raman
 Vivek
 Yogi Babu

Sandalwood (Kannada cinema)

 Balakrishna
 Janardhan
 Bhanu Bandopadhyay
 Bullet Prakash
 Chikkanna
 Dheerendra Gopal
 Dinesh
 Dingri Nagaraj
 Doddanna
 Dwarakish
 Girija Lokesh
 Honnavalli Krishna
 Jaggesh
 Karibasavaiah
 Kashinath
 Komal Kumar
 Kunigal Nagabhushan
 Lokesh
 M. N. Lakshmi Devi
 M. S. Umesh
 Mandya Ramesh
 Mimicry Rajagopal
 Mithra
 Mukhyamantri Chandru
 Musuri Krishnamurthy
 Mysore Lokesh
 Narasimharaju
 Rangayana Raghu
 Ravishankar Gowda
 Rekha Das
 Sadhu Kokila
 Sharan
 Srujan Lokesh
 Tennis Krishna
 Umashree 
 Vaijanath Biradar
 Vaishali Kasaravalli

United Kingdom

 Papa CJ
 Sindhu Vee
 Anuvab Pal

References

 
Lists of comedians
Comedians
comedians